State Route 170 (SR 170) is a north–south running state route located in Mahoning and Columbiana counties in northeast Ohio. It runs within a few miles of the Pennsylvania border for much of its route as it passes through the eastern parts of the two counties. The southern terminus is at an interchange with U.S. 30, State Route 7, and State Route 11 near Calcutta, and the northern at U.S. 62 in Youngstown.  ODOT extended the northern terminus from the previous point of Interstate 680, changing signs on July 16 and 17, 2008.

History
In 1924, it became the original state highway where it routed from East Palestine to Petersburg. In 1931 the highway extended to East Liverpool along a previously unnumbered road. In 2008, it extended  to U.S. 62 in Youngstown along the former Route 625.

Major junctions

References

170
Transportation in Columbiana County, Ohio
Transportation in Mahoning County, Ohio